Bassmaster Classic XXXIII was held on August 1-3, 2003, in the Louisiana Delta surrounding New Orleans, Louisiana. Michael Iaconelli of Woodbury Heights, New Jersey, won the event with a three-day total weight of 37 pounds, 14 ounces. He won $200,000 in prize money. The total weight for the classic was 1,009 pounds, 5 ounces and the  weigh-in was held in the New Orleans Arena.

Top 5 finishers1. Michael Iaconelli, Woodbury Heights, New Jersey, 37-142. Gary Klein Weatherford, Texas, 36-023. Harold Allen, Shelbyville, Texas, 34-034. Roland Martin Clewiston, Florida, 31-095. Curt Lytle Suffolk, Virginia, 31-03

See also
Bassmaster Classic

References

External links
 Official site

Fishing tournaments
Sports in Louisiana
Fishing tournaments
2003 in sports in Louisiana
Fishing in the United States